Nabil Anane (born 30 April 2004), is a Thai-Algerian-French Muay Thai kickboxer based in Thailand. He is a former IFMA youth world Muay Thai champion and competed in Lethwei at the World Lethwei Championship.

Background 
Anane was born on 30 April 2004 from a French-Algerian father and a Thai mother. He started martial arts at 7 years old with Taekwondo and Karate. He started Muay Thai at the age of 11 at the Petchrungruang camp. He is currently under contract of Venum has been training at the Venum training camp of Pattaya under the supervision of Mehdi Zatout since the age of 14.

Muay Thai 
In 26 March 2021, Anane knockout Dodo lukkokruk by elbow in second round at Rangsit Stadium. In 4 March 2021 after 5 rounds of hard fighting he won by decision Wattana Sermphornwiwat at Rangsit Stadium.

In 15 November 2020, he won against Dylan Thorpe by decision at Super Champ Muay Thai.

Nabil faced the former Rajadamnern Stadium champion Samingdet Nor.Anuwatgym at the Rajadamnern Stadium on March 24, 2022. He won the fight by decision.

Nabil faced Petchnarin SatianMuayThai for the vacant WBC Muaythai Featherweight World title on the May 14, 2022, Venum Fight Rajadamnern Stadium event. He won the fight by a second-round knockout and became the youngest WBC Muay Thai Featherweight world champion ever.

Nabil faced Chorfah Tor.Sangtiennoi at Muaydee VitheeThai + Jitmuangnon event at the Or.Tor.Gor3 Stadium on June 12, 2022. He won the fight by decision.

In 2022 Anane took part in the Rajadamnern World Series in the 126 lbs division. In his first group stage fight he defeated Thongnoi Lukbanyai by decision.

Anane is scheduled to face Panpayak Jitmuangnon on March 17, 2023, at ONE Friday Fights 9.

Lethwei 
In 28 August, 2020, Anane faced Sao Phoe Khwar and won by decision at WLC 12: Hideout Battle for the World Lethwei Championship in Yangon.

Titles and accomplishments

Professional
World Kickboxing Network
 2021 WKN Intercontinental Champion
World Professional Muaythai Federation
 2018 WPMF -40 kg Champion 
World Boxing Council Muaythai
2022 WBC Muay Thai Featherweight (126 lbs) World Champion
2023 WBC Muay Thai Lightweight (135 lbs) World Champion

Amateur
International Federation of Muaythai Associations
 2017 IFMA World Championships Youth (12-13 Years old) -38 kg

Fight record 

|-  style="background:#cfc;"
| 2023-02-04 || Win ||align=left| Luca Falco || Amazing Muay Thai Festival || Hua Hin, Thailand|| KO (Knee to the head) || 4 || 
|-
! style=background:white colspan=9 |
|- style="background:#cfc" 
| 2022-12-23 || Win ||align="left" | PetchEk Banraimonta || Rajadamnern World Series || Bangkok, Thailand || KO (Punches) || 1 ||
|-  style="background:#c5d2ea;"
| 2022-11-11 || Draw ||align=left| M Petphuthong Por.Lakboon || Rajadamnern World Series || Bangkok, Thailand || Decision (Unanimous)|| 3 ||3:00 
|-  style="background:#cfc;"
| 2022-09-02 || Win ||align=left| Amirhossein Kamary || Rajadamnern World Series || Bangkok, Thailand || Decision (Unanimous) || 3 || 3:00  
|-  style="background:#cfc;"
| 2022-07-29 || Win ||align=left| Thongnoi Lukbanyai || Rajadamnern World Series || Bangkok, Thailand || Decision (Unanimous) || 3 || 3:00
|-  style="background:#cfc;"
| 2022-06-12 || Win||align=left| Chorfah Tor.Sangtiennoi ||Muaydee VitheeThai + Jitmuangnon, Or.Tor.Gor3 Stadium || Nonthaburi province, Thailand || Decision || 5 ||3:00
|-  style="background:#cfc;"
| 2022-05-14 || Win ||align=left| Petchnarin SatianMuayThai || Venum Fight, Rajadamnern Stadium || Bangkok, Thailand|| KO (Punches & knee) || 2 || 2:40 
|-
! style=background:white colspan=9 |
|-  style="background:#cfc;"
| 2022-03-24 || Win ||align=left| Samingdet Nor.Anuwatgym|| Petchyindee, Rajadamnern Stadium || Bangkok, Thailand || Decision ||5 ||3:00
|- style="background:#fbb;"
|2022-02-17
|Loss
| align="left" | Chorfah Tor.Sangtiennoi
| Petchyindee, Rajadamnern Stadium
| Bangkok, Thailand  
|Decision
|5
|3:00
|- style="background:#fbb;"
|2021-12-10
|Loss
| align="left" | Kiewpayak Jitmuangnon
|Muaymanwsuk, Rangsit Stadium
|Rangsit, Thailand
|Decision
|5
|3:00

|- style="background:#cfc;"
|2021-11-19
|Win
| align="left" | Artid Kawkaigym
|MPRO EVOLUTION, World Siam Stadium
|Bangkok, Thailand
|TKO (Referee Stoppage)
|2
|
|-
! colspan="9" style="background:white" |

|-  style="background:#cfc;"
| 2021-10-28|| Win ||align=left| Tayat Or.Prasert  || Petchyindee + Muay Thai Moradok Kon Thai|| Buriram province, Thailand || Decision|| 5 ||3:00

|- style="background:#CCFFCC;"
|2021-03-26
|Win
| align="left" | Dodo Lukkokruk
|Rangsit Stadium
|Rangsit, Thailand
|Decision
|5
|3:00
|- style="background:#CCFFCC;"
|2021-03-04
|Win
| align="left" | Wattana Sermphornwiwat
|Rangsit Stadium
|Rangsit, Thailand
|Decision
|5
|3:00
|- style="background:#CCFFCC;"
|2020-11-15
|Win
| align="left" | Dylan Thorpe
|Super Champ Muay Thai
|Bangkok, Thailand
|Decision
|3
|3:00
|- style="background:#CCFFCC;"
|2020-10-16
|Win
| align="left" | Numtone Rongirankratiamwitaya||True4u Muaymanwansuk, Rangsit Stadium || Rangsit, Thailand || KO (Knees & elbow)|| 4 ||
|-  bgcolor="#cfc"
| 2019-10-14|| Win ||align=left| Lukbid Suhananpeekmai  || Lumpinee Stadium || Bangkok, Thailand || KO (Right cross)|| 2 ||
|- style="background:#CCFFCC;"
|2019
|Win
| align="left" | Penthep Singpatong
|Lumpinee Stadium
|Bangkok, Thailand
|Decision
|5
|3:00
|-  bgcolor="#cfc"
| 2019-07-23|| Win ||align=left| Phetlela M.U.Den || Lumpinee Stadium || Bangkok, Thailand || KO || 4 ||
|-  bgcolor="#cfc"
| 2018-04-19|| Win ||align=left| Jutathep YodThanu MAF  || Rajadamnern Stadium || Bangkok, Thailand || Decision || 5 || 3:00
|-
|- style="background:#CCFFCC;"
|2018
|Win
| align="left" | Lukkhaoka Sitnayoktaweetapong.
|Bon arena stadium
|Pattaya, Thailand
|Decision
|5
|3:00
|-
! colspan="9" style="background:white" |
|-  bgcolor="#fbb"
| 2017-12-22|| Loss ||align=left| Yodkhunsuk Sitkruyiem|| Magma Muay Thai || Rayong Province, Thailand || Decision || 5 || 3:00
|-  bgcolor="#cfc"
| 2017-11-20 || Win ||align=left| Thailand Kiatpantamit|| Max Muay Thai || Bangkok, Thailand || Decision || 3 || 3:00
|-  bgcolor="#cfc"
| 2017|| Win ||align=left| N/A|| Lumpinee Stadium|| Bangkok, Thailand ||   ||  ||
|-  bgcolor="#cfc"
| 2017|| Win ||align=left| N/A || Venum || Thailand || TKO  ||  ||
|-  bgcolor="#cfc"
| 2017|| Win ||align=left| N/A|| Max Muay Thai || Bangkok, Thailand || KO (Knees) ||  ||
|- style="background:#fbb;"
|2017
|Loss
| align="left" | Kritchtong
|Theparasit stadium
|Pattaya, Thailand
|Decision
|5
|3:00
|- style="background:#CCFFCC;"
|2016
|win
| align="left" | Payaktamin Ormeekun
|Theparasit stadium
|Pattaya, Thailand
|TKO
|3
|
|- style="text-align:center; background:#CCFFCC;"
|2015
|win
| align="left" | Prakaipetch Sitpa O
|Theparasit stadium
|Pattaya, Thailand
|TKO
|4
|
|- style="text-align:center; background:#CCFFCC;"
|2015
|win
| align="left" | Padetnoi Sitorbortorserm
|Theparasit stadium
|Pattaya, Thailand
|Decision
|5
|3:00
|-
| colspan=9 | Legend:    

 Amateur Muaythai record 

|- style="background:#cfc;"
|2017-08-03
|Win
| align="left" | Apihwat Manatphom
|2017 IFMA Youth World Championship, Final
|Bangkok, Thailand
|Decision (30-27)
|3
|3:00
|-
|-
! style=background:white colspan=9 |
|- style="background:white"
|- style="background:#cfc;"
|2017-08-03
|Win
| align="left" | Oliver Hanson
|2017 IFMA Youth World Championship, Semi Final
|Bangkok, Thailand
|Decision (30-27)
|3
|3:00
|- style="background:#cfc;"
|2017-08-03
|Win
| align="left" | N/A
|2017 IFMA Youth World Championship, Quarter Final
|Bangkok, Thailand
|Forfeit (0-0)
|3
|3:00
|-
| colspan=9 | Legend:

Lethwei record 

|- style="background:#CCFFCC;"
|2020-08-28
|Win
| align="left" | Saw Phoe Khwar
|WLC 12: Hideout Battle
|Yangon, Myanmar
|Decision
|5
|3:00
|-
| colspan=9 | Legend:

See also 
	

 Venum
 2020 in World Lethwei Championship

References

External links 

 
 

2004 births
Living people
Nabil Anane
Nabil Anane
French male kickboxers
Algerian male kickboxers
French Muay Thai practitioners
Nabil Anane
Nabil Anane
French Lethwei practitioners
Algerian Lethwei practitioners
French people of Algerian descent
Nabil Anane